Jeffery Bob (born 1 July 1994) is a Ni-Vanuatu footballer who plays as a defensive midfielder.

Club career

Galaxy
Jeffery Bob played for Galaxy in 2014 helping the team to win the Port Vila Second Division.

Amicale
He took part of the winner squad of 2018 PVFA Cup. He also scored a goal in the final match against Galaxy

Malampa Reviviors
Jeffery Bob played two matches for Malampa Revivors at 2019 OFC Champions League

Tafea
He signed for Tafea in 2019. He didn't take part in the Tafea's squad runner-up of 2019 Independence Cup because he played 2019 Pacific Games right before. He took part of the winner squad of 2019 PVFA Cup playing all 5 matches and scored one goal against Tupuji Imere in the group stage.

International career 
Jeffery Bob made his first international appearance for Vanuatu on 14 November 2018 against New Caledonia at Korman Stadium. He scored his first international goal three days later against New Caledonia. He also took part at 2019 Pacific Games playing for Vanuatu national football team playing two matches and scoring a goal against Samoa

International goals
Scores and results list Vanuatu's goal tally first.

Honours

Club 
Galaxy
 Port Vila Second Division: 2014-15
Amicale
 Port Vila FA Cup: 2018
Tafea
 Port Vila FA Cup: 2019

References 

Vanuatu international footballers
Vanuatuan footballers
1994 births
Living people
Association football midfielders
ABM Galaxy F.C. players
Spirit 08 F.C. players
Malampa Revivors F.C. players